Essex Court Chambers is a set of commercial barristers in Lincoln's Inn Fields, central London. It has 96 tenants, of whom 45 are King's Counsel, also known as Silks. It is considered by legal commentators to be one of the 'Magic Circle' of London's most prestigious commercial barristers' chambers.

The former Lord Chief Justice, Sir John Thomas, was a member of Essex Court Chambers when he was at the Bar. Other members or former members of Essex Court Chambers include Lord Collins of Mapesbury, Dame Rosalyn Higgins, Sir Christopher Greenwood, Lord Millett, Lord Steyn, Lord Savile and Lord Mustill.

The set is named after their former premises at 4 Essex Court in the Temple which it left in 1994. The chambers in its current incarnation date back to 1961. Lord Mustill, Michael Kerr (later Lord Justice Kerr), Anthony Evans (later Lord Justice Evans), Anthony Diamond (later Judge Diamond QC) and Robert MacCrindle were its founding members. The Singapore office opened in July 2009 and is located in Maxwell Chambers.

Essex Court Chambers has been awarded ‘Chambers of the Year’ at the Legal Business Awards in 2020, at the Who's Who Legal Awards in 2019 and 2018. and at the British Legal Awards in 2018

On 26 March 2021, it was announced that Essex Court Chambers was one of four entities to be sanctioned by China for spreading what it called "lies and disinformation" about the country. Chinese citizens and institutions are prohibited from doing business with it. Several members of the set subsequently departed.

Notes and sources
Notes

Sources

External links 
 Essex Court Chambers home page
 Profile – Legal 500

Law firms based in London
Barristers' chambers in the United Kingdom